The Coatlicue statue is one of the most famous surviving Aztec sculptures. It is a 2.52 metre (8.3 ft) tall andesite statue by an unidentified Mexica artist. Although there are debates about what or who the statue represents, it is usually identified as the Aztec deity Coatlicue ("Snakes-Her-Skirt"). It is currently located in the National Museum of Anthropology in Mexico City. Originally displayed in the Mexica city of Tenochtitlan, the momentous statue was buried after the 1521 Spanish conquest of the city and excavated roughly 270 years later in 1790.

The statue was most likely completed in 1439 or 1491, although these dates are contested. Like many Aztec statues, it is carved in the round. Notably, it is also carved on its base with an image of the deity Tlaltecuhtli ("earth-lord"), despite the base usually being hidden from view. Similar statues and statuary fragments were discovered in the 20th century, leading scholars to debate the meaning of these works of art and their significance to the Aztec Empire.

Burial, excavation and early interpretations
After the Spanish conquest of Tenochtitlan in 1521, the Spanish invaders ordered the systematic destruction of the city, including Mexica statues and buildings. The Coatlicue statue likely occupied a prominent position in Tenochtitlan. It most likely survived destruction and remains incredibly well-preserved because, upon being ordered to destroy the work, the Mexica people instead buried it below the water table.

The Coatlicue statue was excavated in the main plaza of Mexico City in front of the National Palace on 13 August 1790 during the excavation of a water canal. A few months later, on 17 December 1790, the sun stone (also known as the "calendar stone") was found about 100 feet away. The momentous discovery of these two statues, along with the 1791 excavation of the Tizoc Stone, initiated a new phase of research on the Templo Mayor as contemporary scholars attempted to interpret their dense symbolism and decipher their meanings.

The first known scholar to study the statue after its excavation was Antonio de León y Gama, who identified the god depicted as "Teoyaomiqui", the deity of death and sacred war. The statue was identified as Coatlicue by Mexican archaeologist Alfredo Chavero in his book México á través de los siglos. Because of the carvings on the bottom of the statue, Léon y Gama believed the statue had originally been displayed at an angle, raised from the ground and supported by columns. He was incorrect, as the sculpture would have stood on its base. Aztec sculptures are largely carved in the round, despite the fact that all sides would not be visible at once.

In 1790, the statue had been moved to the National Autonomous University of Mexico to be preserved and studied, but it was soon buried on the orders of professors who feared its presence would encourage adherence to Aztec religion, which settlers had spent centuries suppressing. To prevent this, the statue was buried in the patio of the National Autonomous University of Mexico where it could not be seen. The statue was disinterred in 1803, so that Alexander von Humboldt could make drawings and a cast of it, after which it was reburied. It was again dug up for the final time in 1823, so that William Bullock could make another cast, which was displayed the next year in the Egyptian Hall in Piccadilly, London, as part of Bullock's Ancient Mexico exhibition. The statue remained on the patio at the university until the first National Museum was established.

Visual description and iconography
The densely carved, colossal statue stands 8 feet tall and pitches forward, towering over its viewer and giving the impression that it is advancing forward. The front and back of the statue are bilaterally symmetrical. The annotated drawing below deciphers some of the statue's dense symbolism:

Comparable statues and contemporary debates
Another statue, called Yolotlicue ("heart-her-skirt"), was discovered in 1933. Though badly damaged, it is identical to Coatlicue except for having a skirt of hearts instead of snakes. As with the Coatlicue Statue, the bottom of Yolotlicue  depicts Tlaltecuhtli and the year 12 Reed is inscribed between her shoulder blades. Two fragments of a similar statue or statues also exist, suggesting that these were part of a larger set. Reading the statues as part of a larger set, some scholars have argued that the Coatlicues are Tzitzimime, female deities associated with the stars who would devour humans on earth if the sun were to fail.  

The Coyolxauhqui Stone depicts the Aztec deity Coyolxauhqui who was the daughter of Coatlicue. She was defeated and dismembered by her brother, the patron deity of the Aztecs, Huitzilopochtli. The stone was discovered at the base of the Templo Mayor in 1978. Like the images of Coatlicue and Yolotlicue in the statues and fragments, Coyolxauhqui is also decapitated and dismembered. Some scholars interpret the dismemberment of the Tzitzimime as connected to the dismemberment of Coyolxauhqui, perhaps indicating that the Coatlicues too had angered Huitzilopochtli and suffered the same fate. Others argue that the Tzitzimime are decapitated as a result of sacrificing themselves to put the sun in motion. These debates over the interpretation of the Coatlicue statue continue today.

References

Aztec artifacts
Mesoamerican stone sculpture